Cruz y Ortiz arquitectos is an architectural studio founded by Antonio Cruz Villalón and Antonio Ortiz García. The studio have offices in Seville and in Amsterdam.

Biography 
Architect Antonio Cruz Villalón was born in Seville, Spain, in 1948, and graduated from the Superior Technical School of Architecture of Madrid in 1971. He is a member of the Andalusian Architects' Association (Num. 953). Antonio Ortiz was born in Seville in 1947, and graduated from the same university in 1974. He is a member of the Andalusian Architects' Association (num. 1206). After graduating, he worked with Ricardo Aroca and Rafael Moneo.
From 1974 they taught at the Escuela de Arquitectura, Seville. They also taught at prestigious institutions around the world, such as Eidgenössische Technische Houchschule (ETH) in Zurich and Harvard Graduate School of Design.

Work 

1973–1976 Housing project at C/ Doña María Coronel, Seville. Spain
1977–1980 Housing project at C/ Lumbreras, Seville. Spain
1981–1986 Adaptation for the Historic Provincial Archive of the  Casa de las Cadenas, Cádiz. Spain
1982–1987 Adaptation of the Old Courthouse Building into the State Historical Archive and Municipal Archives, Seville. Spain
1986–1989 Housing project at Caravanchel, Madrid. Spain
1986–1989 Adaptation of the Candelaria Bulwork to a Maritime Museum, Cádiz. Spain
1987–1992 Santa Justa Train Station, Seville. Spain
1988–1992 Housing project in Tharsis, Huelva. Spain
1988–1991 Spanish Cultural Institute, Lisbon. Portugal
1989 Spanish Pavilion at the Expo 92, Seville. Spain. Competition.
1989–1994 Madrid Community Sports Stadium, Madrid. Spain
1990–1994 Huelva Bus Terminal. Spain
1991–1995 New Headquarters for the Seville Provincial Government. Spain
1994–1996 Java-Eiland Residential Complex, Amsterdam. The Netherlands
1994–1995 Port buildings in Cádiz, Spain.
1995–1999 Seville Public Library, Seville. Spain
1997–2003 Remodellation and enlargement of the SBB Train Station, Basel. Switzerland
1997–2000 Seville Olympic Stadium. Spain
1998–2000 Spanish Pavilion at World Expo 2000 Hannover. Germany
1999–2002 Patio Sevilla, housing complex, Maastricht. The Netherlands
2002–2010 Twin towers in the Wilheminapier in Rotterdam. Project in redaction.
2002- Masterplan of the Olympic Ring for Madrid 2012. Project in redaction
2003–2013 Enlargement of  Rijksmuseum in Amsterdam. The Netherlands. 
2009- Estadio La Peineta, Madrid, Spain. Project in redaction.

Awards 
1980 Perez Carasa Award for the Single-family Housing Unit in Punta Umbria, granted by the Professional Association of Architects of the Western Andalusia/Huelva Area.
1982 City of Seville Award for new buildings for the housing block on Lumbreras Street, granted by the Seville City Council.
1989 Award for Best New Building from the Madrid City Council for the Carabanchel Housing Project.
1990 Finalists in Mies van der Rohe Pavilion Award for European Architecture for the Carabanchel Housing Project in Madrid.
1992 Brunel 92 International Award for Railway Design for the Santa Justa Train Station in Seville.
1992 Finalists in Mies van der Rohe Pavilion Award for European Architecture for the Santa Justa Train Station in Seville
1993 Spanish Architecture Award for the Santa Justa Station in Seville, granted by the Governing Council of the Professional Colleges of Architects of Spain and the Ministry of Public Works, Transport and Environment.
1995 Architecture Award of the Professional Association of Architects of Western Andalusia for 1994 for New Building for the Huelva Bus Terminal.
1997 Spanish Entrepreneurs' Foundation Award, granted by the C.E.O.E. Foundation (Confederación Española de Organizaciones Empresariales), Madrid, for the Madrid Community Sports Stadium.
1997 Andalusian Gold Medal Award, granted by the Andalusian Regional Government and the Andalusian Parliament, for the whole of their work.
1998 National Sports Award 1998. National Award for Sports' Architecture, granted by the Consejo Superior de Deporte (Ministry for Culture and Education), Madrid, for the Madrid Community Sports Stadium and the Olympic Stadium in Seville.
1999 Eduardo Torroja Award for the  Olympic Stadium in Seville, granted by the Ministerio de Fomento (Ministry for Development).
2003 Heimatschutz Prize, granted by Basler Heimatschutz, Basilea, for the Remodellation and enlargement of the SBB Train Station, Basel. Switzerland
2004 José Manuel Lara Foundation Culture Awards. Plastic Arts Award  for their work as a whole.
2006 Special mention Daylight Award awarded by Velux Stiftung, Swiss, for "The Redesign and Extension of the Train Station SBB", Basilea (Swiss).
2008 Andalusian Architect Award, for the Remodellation and enlargement of the SBB Train Station, Basel. Switzerland.

References

External links 

Architecture firms of Spain